"All Day" and "(Every Day Is) Halloween" are songs by American band Ministry, both written and produced by Al Jourgensen. These were originally released by Wax Trax! Records in 1984 as Ministry's “comeback” single following their departure from Arista Records, with "All Day" on the A-side and "(Every Day Is) Halloween" on the B-side, respectively. In 1987, these were included on Ministry's compilation Twelve Inch Singles (1981–1984). The remixed version of "All Day", titled “All Day Remix”, was featured on Ministry's 1986 album Twitch. “(Every Day Is) Halloween” has been featured in the 1998 Rhino Records compilation Just Can't Get Enough: New Wave Halloween.

Music writer Dave Thompson described "(Every Day Is) Halloween" as having been "adopted as the anthem of America's disenfranchised Gothic community."

On October 31, 2019, the track was re-released as an acoustic version with the help of Dave Navarro on acoustic guitar.

On October 30, 2020, Stabbing Westward released a cover version.

Track listing

1986 12"

2010 digital single

Every Day Is Halloween: The Remixes

Personnel
Credits adapted from liner notes of the “All Day / (Every Day Is) Halloween” single, Twelve Inch Singles (1981–1984) and Twitch.
 Al Jourgensen – vocals, instrumentation, production
 Brad Hallen – bass (“All Day”)
 Stephen George – drums (“All Day”)
 Patty Jourgensen – backing vocals (“All Day Remix”)
 Brian Shanley and Jim Nash – artwork (single)

See also
 Ministry discography

References

Further reading

External links
 

1984 singles
1984 songs
Ministry (band) songs
Wax Trax! Records singles
Halloween songs
Songs written by Al Jourgensen
Song recordings produced by Al Jourgensen